Holmes Township may refer to the following places in the United States:

 Holmes Township, Michigan
 Holmes Township, Crawford County, Ohio

Township name disambiguation pages